was a Japanese professional sumo wrestler from Ogachi, Akita. He was the sport's 38th yokozuna. He was promoted to yokozuna without any top division tournament titles to his name, although he later attained two.

Career
In the summer of 1930, he was scouted by Isegahama, former sekiwake Kiyosegawa Keinosuke, his distant relative. However, he was largely forgotten due to the disruption caused by the Shunjuen Incident of 1932, in which a large number of wrestlers went on strike. After the dispute was settled, he joined Isegahama stable in 1934, making his debut in January 1935 with the Terukuni Manzō shikona or ring name.

He was promoted to the top makuuchi division in May 1939, and reached the ōzeki rank in May 1941. After two tournaments at ōzeki, he finished in a three way tie for the championship in May 1942 with Futabayama and Akinoumi, on 13-2. The championship was awarded to Futabayama (whom Terukuni had defeated in their individual match) simply because he was of a higher rank, as was the rule at the time. Nevertheless, after the tournament both Terukuni and Akinoumi were promoted to yokozuna. At 23 years of age, Terukuni was the youngest wrestler to reach the yokozuna rank until the promotion of Taihō in 1961. He did well in his yokozuna debut, scoring 14–1, although he finished one win behind Futabayama, who won his last match by default.

During World War II, his weight declined due to the food shortages.

Having been a runner-up on five previous occasions, Terukuni finally won his first championship in September 1950, about eight years after his promotion. He won his second championship in the very next tournament with a perfect 15–0 record.

Three days into the January 1953 tournament, he announced his retirement. After the tournament, Kagamisato was promoted to yokozuna, and a photograph was taken of Terukuni and Kagamisato alongside the other grand champions Chiyonoyama, Azumafuji and Haguroyama. As Terukuni had not yet had his official retirement ceremony, some regard January 1953 as being the only occasion on which there were five yokozuna at the same time.

Retirement from sumo

After his retirement, Terukuni became head coach of Isegahama stable and produced ōzeki Kiyokuni Katsuo. He had already made arrangements to pass control over the stable over to Kiyokuni at the time of his death in 1977 at the age of 58.

Career record

Through most of the 1940s only two tournaments were held a year, and in 1946 only one was held. The New Year tournament began and the Spring tournament moved to Osaka in 1953.

See also
Glossary of sumo terms
List of past sumo wrestlers
List of sumo tournament top division champions
List of yokozuna

References

External links

 Japan Sumo Association profile

1919 births
1977 deaths
Japanese sumo wrestlers
Sumo people from Akita Prefecture
Yokozuna